Mount Wilson can refer to several things:

Antarctica
 Mount Wilson (Antarctica), a mountain on the Bowman Coast of Antarctica

Australia
 Mount Wilson, New South Wales, a mountain with a small hamlet

United States
 Mount Wilson (Arizona)
 Mount Wilson (California)
 Mount Wilson Observatory
 Mount Wilson (Colorado)
 Mount Wilson, Nevada, a census-designated place in Lincoln County
 Mount Wilson (Clark County, Nevada)
 Mount Wilson (Lyon County, Nevada)
 Mount Wilson (Vermont)

See also
 List of peaks named Mount Wilson